The  is a museum in Ueno, Taito, Tokyo, Japan. Located on the shores of Shinobazu Pond within Ueno Park, it is dedicated to the traditional culture of Tokyo's Shitamachi.

The museum opened in 1980, six years before the Fukagawa Edo Museum and thirteen years before the Edo-Tokyo Museum, all part of a national trend for building local history museums. All three were primarily designed by Total Media.

Historical background
Shitamachi, literally 'Low City', is the unofficial name for the Tokyo flatlands, the area of Tokyo going from Taitō to Chiyoda and Chuō. It is the physically low part of the city just east of the Sumida River. It was inhabited by Edo's lower classes, including craftsmen, fishermen, sailors and merchants. The area produced most of what was original in Edo's culture and was the entertainment and shopping center of the capital. What remains of the old Shitamachi can nowadays be found  in and around Tokyo's Taito, for example in Asakusa. The Shitamachi Museum is dedicated to explaining this area and its distinctive culture through original artifacts.

Exhibits

First floor
To the right of the entrance is a life-size replica of a merchant's house, where geta (Japanese-style wooden clogs) are made and sold. In front of the shop are parked a rickshaw and a hand-pulled cart from old Edo.

To the left stands the replica of a small tenement house shared by two families, each owning a shop. On one side there live a mother and her daughter, who sell cheap sweets in the small shop adjacent their living quarters. On the other, there lives a coppersmith who works and sells his wares here. The well and the washing board next to the house are original items used in Edo times in the Shitamachi. All objects exhibited were donated by the public and were in use during the Taishō period (1912–1926).

Second floor
The second floor consists of a more varied collection of exhibits. There are toys, dolls, photos, kitchen utensils, board games, card games, plus exhibits related to festivals and other events. There is even the entrance of a public bath (a sentō) donated by the original owner.

References

The rest of the article is based on the leaflet given to visitors at The Shitamachi Museum (English version).

External links

 Shitamachi Museum

Photo gallery

History museums in Japan
Museums in Tokyo
Ueno Park
Buildings and structures in Taitō
1980 establishments in Japan
Museums established in 1980